Apollonia Salbaces or Apollonia Salbakes was a town in ancient Caria, Anatolia.

It became the seat of a bishop, and under the name Apollonia Salbace it remains a titular see of the Roman Catholic Church.

The site of Apollonia Salbaces is near the modern Medet.

References

Archaeological sites in the Aegean Region
Ancient Greek archaeological sites in Turkey
Roman sites in Turkey
Populated places in ancient Caria
Former populated places in Turkey
History of Denizli Province
Catholic titular sees in Asia
Tavas District
Populated places of the Byzantine Empire